Tomas Pačėsas (born November 11, 1971) is a Lithuanian former professional basketball player, basketball coach, businessman, and politician.

Playing career

Club career
Pačėsas was the Polish League MVP, in 2004.

Lithuanian senior national team
Pačėsas was a member of the senior Lithuanian national team that won bronze medals at the 1996 Summer Olympic Games.

Coaching career
In December 2015, Pačėsas signed on as the head coach of Lietuvos rytas. He helped Rytas win the King Mindaugas Cup, but suffered a disastrous 3rd-place finish in the LKL after losing to Neptūnas in the semifinals. In June 2016, he extended his contract for one more year. The 2016-2017 season was even more disastrous, as the team struggled in the LKL and failed to qualify to the Eurocup playoffs. In February 2017, Pačėsas resigned, and left Lietuvos rytas.

Career statistics

EuroLeague

|-
| style="text-align:left;"| 2001–02
| style="text-align:left;"| Śląsk Wrocław
| 5 || 0 || 15.3 || .384 || .714 || .000 || 1.2 || 1.4 || .2 || .0 || 3.0 || 2.0
|-
| style="text-align:left;"| 2004–05
| style="text-align:left;" rowspan="3"| Asseco Prokom
| 19 || 19 || 30.2 || .283 || .215 || .444 || 2.8 || 4.1 || 1.8 || .1 || 4.9 || 5.5
|-
| style="text-align:left;"| 2005–06
| 13 || 11 || 28.1 || .426 || .400 || .667 || 2.5 || 2.8 || 1.2 || .0 || 6.2 || 7.2
|-
| style="text-align:left;"| 2006–07
| 7 || 0 || 10.2 || .250 || .286 || .000 || .4 || 1.0 || .3 || .0 || .9 || .1
|- class="sortbottom"
| style="text-align:center;" colspan="2"|Career
| 44 || 30 || 24.8 || .331 || .308 || .533 || 2.2 || 2.9 || 1.2 || .0 || 4.4 || 4.8

EuroCup

|-
| style="text-align:left;"| 2003–04
| style="text-align:left;"| Asseco Prokom
| 12 || 11 || 26.4 || .488 || .490 || 1.000 || 2.8 || 4.3 || 1.2 || .0 || 10.4 || 12.3

Awards and accomplishments

Pro career
North European League Champion: (2001)
Russian Championship Champion: (2001)
6× Polish League Champion: (2002, 2003, 2004, 2005, 2006, 2007)

Lithuanian senior national team
1996 Summer Olympic Games:

References

1971 births
Living people
1998 FIBA World Championship players
Arka Gdynia basketball coaches
Asseco Gdynia players
Basketball players at the 1996 Summer Olympics
BC Odesa players
KK Włocławek players
Legia Warsaw (basketball) players
Lithuanian basketball coaches
Lithuanian expatriate basketball people in Poland
Lithuanian men's basketball players
LSU-Atletas basketball players
Maccabi Rishon LeZion basketball players
Medalists at the 1996 Summer Olympics
Olympic basketball players of Lithuania
Olympic bronze medalists for Lithuania
Olympic medalists in basketball
PBC Ural Great players
Point guards
Śląsk Wrocław basketball players
Sportspeople from Alytus
Sportspeople from Kaunas